Krzysztof Jakub Stanowski (born 21 July 1982) is a Polish journalist, columnist and businessman, co-owner of the Weszło group and Kanał Sportowy.

Career 
He graduated from the Klementyna Hoffmanowa Liceum in Warsaw. He studied journalism, but did not complete his studies.

He started his career as a journalist at the age of 14, when he was accepted for an internship in the editorial office of "Przegląd Sportowy". In 1997–2001 he wrote articles for the "Nasza Legia" magazine. In 2002 he was a correspondent for "Przegląd Sportowy" at the 2002 FIFA World Cup, and in 2005 he became the head of the football department of this newspaper. Then he collaborated with "Super Express", "Dziennik" and the editorial offices of "Futbol" and "Futbolnews". He is the co-founder and co-owner of the portal weszlo.com, which was launched in 2008, as well as the internet sports radio weszlo.fm. He was a Polish ambassador of bookmakers such as "bet24" and "Party Gaming".

Co-author of biographies of such footballers as Andrzej Iwan, Wojciech Kowalczyk and Grzegorz Szamotulski. In 2013, he was nominated for the Grand Press award for the best Polish journalist. In 2016–2017, he hosted the program Stan Futbolu on Eleven Sports, who currently continues on the WeszłoTV/weszlo.fm and TVP Sport.

In 2018, he founded the KTS Weszło Warsaw football club which a year later was promoted to the Warsaw A class. He was a co-organizer of bringing to this club footballers from the Democratic Republic of the Congo, who played there at amateur level, fully financing the operation and their life after their arrival in Poland. Among the players who were brought in, Merveille Fundambu ended up in the first-league Radomiak Radom and Widzew Łódź,; Ituku Owe Bonyanga in the second-league Znicz Pruszków. and Jonathan Simba Bwanga in the first-league Stomil Olsztyn.

In March 2020, together with Michał Pol, Tomasz Smokowski and Mateusz Borek, he officially launched Kanał Sportowy on YouTube.

In 2021, as part of a happening, together with Robert Mazurek, he published a book of poems entitled "Kmioty Polskie", the income from which was donated to charity.

Personal life 
Ursula's son. His father died in 1997. Married to Marta, they have sons Leon and Aleksander. Spanish football enthusiast and FC Barcelona fan.

Publications 
 Kowal. Prawdziwa historia – a book about Wojciech Kowalczyk. It had its re-edition in 2021.
 Andrzej Iwan. Spalony – a book about Andrzej Iwan
 Szamo – a book about Grzegorz Szamotulski
 Stan Futbolu
 Kmioty Polskie

References 

1982 births
Living people
Polish sports journalists
Polish television journalists
Polish radio journalists
Polish YouTubers
Journalists from Warsaw